Roderick 'Rod' Hampton Scott (born November 9, 1958) is an American politician. He is a member of the Alabama House of Representatives, serving since 2006, representing the 55th House District, that includes Fairfield, Elyton, and Birmingham. As a member of the Democratic party, he is the ranking minority member of the Education Policy Committee, Fiscal Responsibility Committee, and Ways and Means Education Committee of the Alabama State Legislature.

He holds a B.A. in Economics from Yale University and an MBA from the Amos Tuck School of Business Administration at Dartmouth College. He has been a professor at Miles College, and is a member of Phi Beta Sigma fraternity.

References

External links

Living people
1958 births
Democratic Party members of the Alabama House of Representatives
21st-century American politicians
African-American state legislators in Alabama
Yale University alumni
Tuck School of Business alumni